This is a list of all military equipment ever used by Italy. This list shall go in chronological order of newest military equipment of Italy to oldest.

Italian Army 

 List of military weapons of Italy

Italian Navy 

 List of active Italian Navy ships
 List of decommissioned ships of the Italian Navy
 Regia Marina

Italian Air Force 

 List of aircraft used by Italian Air Force
 List of Regia Aeronautica aircraft used in World War II
 List of World War I Entente aircraft

References 

equipment
Italy